ImPulsTanz Vienna International Dance Festival is a major contemporary dance festival held in Vienna, Austria each year. It gathers thousands of professional dancers, choreographers and teachers for a five-week program of performance, research projects and workshops. It was started by Karl Regensburger and choreographer Ismael Ivo in 1984 as the "Internationale Tanzwochen Wien" with dance teachers including Joe Alegado, Germaine Acogny and Walter Raines.

In 1988 it took the name "ImPulsTanz Vienna International Dance Festival" with works by Wim Vandekeybus, Marie Chouinard and Mark Tompkins.

It set up danceWEB Europe in 1996, initially as a scholarship program and now facilitating sharing ideas and knowledge, further training and gathering renowned artists

Notes

External links

ImPulsTanz Vienna International Dance Festival
EVERYBODY DANCE - interview with Rio Rutzinger, the artistic director of workshops and research at the ImPulsTanz 2015
"You are gonna love me" Sylvia Staude reports from Vienna's (2006) ImPulsTanz festival..., Sign and Sight, 26 July 2006 accessed 22 June 2007
some interviews from imPULStanz 2008, the 25th anniversary.

Dance festivals in Austria
Contemporary dance
Dance in Austria
Festivals in Vienna
Culture in Vienna
Tourist attractions in Vienna
1984 establishments in Austria
Festivals established in 1984